Hydrococcidae is a family of small sea snails, marine gastropod molluscs in the clade Littorinimorpha.

Genera
Hydrococcus Thiele, 1928
 Hydrococcus brazieri (J. E. Tennison-Woods, 1876) (synonyms : Assiminea brazieri, Ampullarina minuta Tenison Woods, 1877)

References

External links
 The Taxonomicon
 Wilke T., Haase M., Hershler R., Liu H.-P., Misof B. & Ponder W. (2013) Pushing short DNA fragments to the limit: Phylogenetic relationships of ‘hydrobioid' gastropods (Caenogastropoda: Rissooidea). Molecular Phylogenetics and Evolution, 66: 715-736